Henry Bryant may refer to:

 Henry Bryant (botanist) (1721–1799), English botanist
 Henry Bryant (naturalist) (1820–1867), American physician and naturalist
 Henry Beadman Bryant (1824–1892), author and co-founder and namesake of Bryant & Stratton College and Bryant University in Smithfield, Rhode Island
 Henry Charles Bryant (1812–1890), English portrait and landscape painter
 Henry Grier Bryant (1859–1932), American explorer and writer
 Henry Bryant Bigelow (1879–1967), American oceanographer and marine biologist